The Grinnall Specialist Cars Ltd. ( Grinnall Cars) is an automobile and motorcycles maker founded by Mark Grinnall in United Kingdom. This company mainly produced three-wheelers. It is based in Bewdley, 
Worcestershire

History 
In the beginning, Grinnall Cars started to modify Triumph TR7 cars. By 1990 they produced 350 units of Grinnall TR8 based on Triumph TR8.
In 1991 Grinnall started to produce three-wheelers (also known as Trikes).
In 1992 they started Scorpion III development.
In 1998 started Scorpion IV development.

Production list 

TR8
Trike 1200C/CL also known as Trike I.
Trike 1150R also known as Trike II.
Trike R3T
Scorpion III
Scorpion IV

See also
 List of car manufacturers of the United Kingdom
 List of motorized trikes

References
Grinnall Specialist Cars Ltd. official website.
Grinnall Scorpion Owners Club
3-wheelers.com Online A-Z of 3-wheeled cars.

Car manufacturers of the United Kingdom
Three-wheeled motor vehicles
Companies based in Worcestershire